Pema Chophel (born 6 August 1981) is a Bhutanese international footballer, currently playing for Yeedzin. He made his first appearance for the Bhutan national football team in 2003.

Career statistics

International goals

References

1981 births
Bhutanese footballers
Bhutan international footballers
Transport United F.C. players
Yeedzin F.C. players
Living people

Association football midfielders